Andrew Warren "Bud" Messenger (February 1, 1898 – November 4, 1971) was a Major League Baseball pitcher. In 5 career games, he had a 2–0 record, with a 4.32 ERA. He batted and threw right-handed.

Messenger was born in Grand Blanc, Michigan, and died in Lansing, Michigan.

External links
Baseball Reference.com page

1898 births
1971 deaths
People from Grand Blanc, Michigan
Cleveland Indians players
Major League Baseball pitchers
Baseball players from Michigan